Salim Kumar (born 10 October 1969) is an Indian actor, comedian, director and writer in Malayalam cinema. Mostly known for his comic and comedy roles, Salim Kumar is considered one of the best and most prominent comedians in the history of Malayalam cinema.

In his later career, Salim Kumar also found success in playing character roles and won the National Film Award for Best Actor in 2010 for his role in Adaminte Makan Abu (which also won the year's Kerala State Film Award). His directorial film Karutha Joothan won the 2017 Kerala State Film Award for Best Story. He has also won the Kerala State Film Award for Second Best Actor for Achanurangatha Veedu (2005) and a Kerala State Television Award for Best Actor (2013).

Early life
Salim Kumar was born on 10 October 1969 in North Paravur, as the youngest son of Gangadharan and Kausalya. He once told an interviewer that his father was an atheist and a follower of the veteran social reformer Sahodaran Ayyappan, who was also from North Paravur, and so named his son Salim Kumar to avoid religious associations.

Kumar attended the Govt. Lower Primary School, Chittattukara North Paravur; went to high school at the Govt. Boys High School, North Paravur; and completed his pre-degree education at Sree Narayana Mangalam College Malyankara, Moothakunnam. He wanted to become a singer at a young age but later took up mimicry. He graduated with a BA from Maharajas College, Ernakulam where he won the university's Mimicry title thrice. He started his stage career at Cochin Kalabhavan. He was also a performer in Comicola, a comedy program on Asianet. For about four years, he was associated with professional drama in Arathi Theatres, Cochin.

Film career
Before entering into Malayalam film industry, Salim Kumar was chosen as host for a comedy programme called Comicola broadcast on Asianet. He made his debut in Malayalam cinema with the 1997 family drama Ishtamanu Nooru Vattam, directed by Siddique Shameer. After doing some minor roles in numerous movies, Sibi Malayil offered Salim Kumar a role in his movie Nee Varuvolam. However he was sent back from the location by the production controller by saying that his acting was not right. He was later replaced by Indrans to do the role. He was later noted for his performance in the movie Satyameva Jayathe, which was released in 2000. After getting impressed with his performance in Satyameva Jayathe, director Rafi Meccartin offered Salim a role in his movie Thenkasipattanam, which was a major breakthrough in his film career. It was one of the highest grossing movie of 2000. In the movie One Man Show, he played the memorable role of a patient escaped from mental hospital. Salim Kumar then found success while acting along with Dileep. In some movies, the duo is joined by Harishree Ashokan. In the 2001 slapstick comedy movie Ee Parakkum Thalika, he played the role of cook Koshi while in the 2002 cult comedy movie Meesa Madhavan, he did the role of Advocate Mukundan Unni. He is also remembered for his performances alongside Cochin Haneefa in Mazhathullikkilukkam and Kunjikkoonan. In the movie Kalyanaraman, Salim Kumar played the role of Pyaari, which is considered one of the finest comedy performance in his career. He played one of the lead roles in the 2002 slapstick comedy film Bamboo Boys alongside Kalabhavan Mani, Cochin Haneefa and Harishree Ashokan.

Salim Kumar probably played some of the most memorable comedy roles in his career in 2003. He played the character of a psychic mental patient in the classic cult movie C.I.D. Moosa. His role as Omanakkuttan in Thilakkam, Usman in Kilichundan Mampazham alongside Mohanlal and S.I. Gabbar Keshavan in Pattalam were memorable ones. It was in the romantic-comedy movie Pulival Kalyanam that Salim Kumar played the most memorable character in his career. Most of the critics acclaims this character called Manavalan as the best comedy character played by Salim Kumar. The many expressions of Manavalan, including his helpless face, his coy smile and act as a rich man smoking pipe later developed a cult following in Kerala and are widely used in memes.

Alongside Jayasurya, Salim Kumar's other famous role is Dance Master Vikram in the movie Chathikkatha Chandu (2004). One of the other popular character played by Salim Kumar came out in the 2007 Mammootty movie Mayavi. His character called Kannan Srank/Ashan has been widely used in Malayalam memes.

Salim Kumar's potential to do the character roles were revealed in 2004, after receiving critical acclaim for his role in the Kamal movie Perumazhakkalam. Though slightly comedic, the role was realistic, allowing him to display different acting skills. His role as the father in Achanurangatha Veedu (2005), directed by Lal Jose, was a major break in his acting career, when he was able to shrug off the usual idiot-fool-illiterate comedic roles for which he seemed destined. The role won him the Kerala State Film Award for Second Best Actor. He was then declared the winner of the National Award for Best Actor for his performance in Adaminte Makan Abu in 2010.

Salim Kumar appeared in a hip-hop number in Vineeth Srinivasan's album "Coffee @ MG Road - Palavattam" (2008). It was an instant hit and developed a cult following.

Salim Kumar later ventured into direction, directing documentaries and feature-length dramas that were well received by critics. Karutha Joothan (2017), which is written and directed by Salim Kumar won the award for the Best Story at the 47th Kerala State Film Awards. His next directorial effort was Daivame Kaithozham K. Kumar Akanam (2018), starring Jayaram in the lead role.

Personal life
Kumar lives in North Paravur-Ernakulam District, in a house called "Laughing Villa". He and his wife Sunitha have two sons, Chandu and Aaromal. He is a member of Indian National Congress in Kerala. He has written a memoir called Ishwara Vazhakkillello.
He conducts a mimicry troupe, Cochin Stallions, which introduced cine-serial actor Ramesh Pisharody and many other talents.

Filmography

Malayalam

1990s

2000s

2010s

2020s

Other languages

As director

As dubbing artist

Utopiayile Rajavu-Voice for Kakka(Voice For Crow)
Alamara-Voice for Alamara (Voice For Wooden Wardrobe)
Keshu Ee Veedinte Nadhan - narrator
Mukundan Unni Associates - Voice for Mukundan's grandfather

Television

Awards and nominations

Other awards
 2005: Sathyan Award - Achanurangatha Veedu
 2005: Bharathan Award - Achanurangatha Veedu
 2010: Jaihind TV Film Award for Best Actor - Adaminte Makan Abu
 2010: Amrita-FEFKA Film Award's Special Jury Award - Adaminte Makan Abu
 2011: Prem Nazir Award
 2012: Best Actor for Adaminte Makan Abu at Imagine India International Film Festival

References

External links

 
 Salim Kumar Official Website
 Salim Kumar at MSI
 Palavattam Hip-Hop single featuring Salim Kumar

Male actors from Kerala
Living people
Kerala State Film Award winners
1969 births
Best Actor National Film Award winners
Male actors in Malayalam cinema
Indian male film actors
Maharaja's College, Ernakulam alumni
21st-century Indian male actors
People from Ernakulam district
20th-century Indian male actors
Indian male comedians
Male actors in Malayalam television
Indian male television actors